Aag Ke Sholay (English translation - Flames of Fire) is 1988 Hindi language action movie directed by S. R. Pratap, starring Hemant Birje, Gulshan Grover, Vijeta Pandit, Sumeet Saigal, Sripada and Rashmi Inder.

Plot
A landlord murders a school teacher of his village because he protests against his crimes. A man returns to take revenge of it and kills all the dacoits and the landlord.

Cast
 Hemant Birje
 Gulshan Grover
 Vijeta Pandit
 Sumeet Saigal
 Bharat Kapoor
Yunus Parvez
 Sunil Dhawan
 Sripada
 Rashmi Inder

Music
Lyrics: Khalid

"Baharo Me Dhumtara Nazaro Me Dhumtara" - Anuradha Paudwal, Amit Kumar
"Balam Batiyao Na" - Shabbir Kumar, Alka Yagnik, Amit Kumar
"Bas Me Nahi Hai Jawani Meri Baat Samajho Bairo" - Alka Yagnik
"Bigdi Huyee Banado Sarkaar-e-madina" - Mohammed Aziz 
"Kal Talak Janta Pe Atyachar Jo Karte" - Amit Kumar, Alka Yagnik, Shabbir Kumar
"Kandhe Se Milake Kandha Kare Bhlayi Ka Dhandha" - Anuradha Paudwal, Alka Yagnik
"Mai Ka Karoon Bhagwan Mera" - Vijayta Pandit

References

External links 
 

1988 films
1980s Hindi-language films
Indian rape and revenge films
Films scored by Vijay